Liisa Salmi (1 October 1914 - 30 August 2001) was a Finnish speed skater. She won a silver medal at the World Allround Speed Skating Championships for Women in 1939 in Tampere, behind Verne Lesche.

References

External links
 

1914 births
2001 deaths
Finnish female speed skaters
World Allround Speed Skating Championships medalists